Anwarullah Chowdhury is a Bangladeshi academic. He served as the 24th Vice-chancellor of the University of Dhaka. He was the ambassador of Bangladesh to Bahrain.

Education and career
Chowdhury earned his master's degree in Sociology from the University of Dhaka and Ph.D. from Delhi School of Economics.

Chowdhury was a member of University Grants Commission, a visiting professor of Minnesota State University, a visiting fellow of University of Sussex and dean of the faculty of Social Science. He is the founder chairman of Anthropology Department of the University of Dhaka.

Chowdhury was appointed the vice-chancellor of Green University of Bangladesh in February 2008 and Bangladesh Islami University in April 2014.

Controversy
On 1 August 2002, Chowdhury, along with proctor Nazrul Islam, resigned from the vice-chancellor position of the University of Dhaka following an assault into Shamsunnahar Hall, a female hall, by male police on 23 July. The female students had been protesting the illegal stay of political activists in the university dormitories. Chowdhury faced criticism at that time for failing to take measures against the police assault.

In August 2015, a trust fund, worth of 600,000 Taka, named "Professor DR Anwarullah Chowdhury Trust Fund" was established at Anthropology Department of the University of Dhaka. The trust fund was revoked within a month, following student protests against it.

In February 2018, Chowdhury was appointed as a part-time teacher of the anthropology department. But he was relieved from the duty within a week.

References

Living people
1945 births
People from Feni District
University of Dhaka alumni
Delhi School of Economics alumni
Academic staff of the University of Dhaka
Ambassadors of Bangladesh to Bahrain
Vice-Chancellors of the University of Dhaka
Vice-Chancellors of Bangladesh Islami University